Onyekachi Okafor (born 2 June 1994, in Aba) is a Nigerian footballer who plays as a forward for Küçük Kaymaklı Türk S.K. in Cyprus.

Career
Okafor began his football youth career at Enyimba International F.C. and professional career with Crown F.C. before moved to Warri Wolves in 2014. He played two seasons at Rivers United before he moved to Turkey to play for Giresunspor in 2014. In August 2016, he signed at Giresunspor in TFF First League. In the summer of 2017, he joined Yalova SK. He later joined Doğan Türk Birliği in the winter of 2018.

International appearances 
He was called up to the senior team for the first time in March 2015 for a friendly against the Cranes of Uganda and South Africa’s Bafana Bafana.

References

External links
 
 Eurosport
 
 KTFF

Living people
1994 births
People from Aba, Abia
Nigerian footballers
Nigerian expatriate footballers
Nigerian expatriate sportspeople in Turkey
Nigerian expatriate sportspeople in Cyprus
Expatriate footballers in Cyprus
Expatriate footballers in Turkey
TFF First League players
Crown F.C. players
Warri Wolves F.C. players
Rivers United F.C. players
Giresunspor footballers
Doğan Türk Birliği footballers
Association football forwards